Jeeto Pakistan League (season 2) is the 2nd season of Jeeto Pakistan League, a "league"-based format of Jeeto Pakistan Presented by Fahad Mustafa, it is starting airing from Ramadan 2021 on ARY Digital.

Teams
The show consists of six teams competing for grand prize. In 2021, 6th team was announced as Multan Tigers for the city Multan. Shoaib Malik was selected as a captain of Multan Tigers team. Sarfraz Ahmed was replaced by Ejaz Aslam as the captain of Quetta Knights team as Sarfraz Ahmed was busy in Pakistan vs South Africa ODI series.

Notes:
 C = Champions; 
 R = Runner-up;
 (x) = Position at the end of the league;

Matches

References 

Urdu-language television shows
Pakistani game shows
ARY Digital original programming